Eastgate Mall is a shopping mall located in Glen Este, Ohio, in the suburbs of Cincinnati, Ohio. The mall contains over 15 stores. The anchor stores are Dillard's, Kohl's, and JCPenney. There is 1 vacant anchor store that was once Sears. Wells Fargo owns and manages the mall (As of July 2022). In 1988, Tom Cruise and Dustin Hoffman made a public appearance upon the release of the hit film Rain Man.

History
Jacobs Visconsi & Jacobs developed Eastgate Mall. Construction began in 1974, with J. C. Penney and Sears confirmed as anchor stores. At opening day, the mall featured these two stores, along with 90 other tenants and space for two additional department stores.

McAlpin's opened to the public in 1992. It would be renamed Dillard's in 1998. On August 4, 1995, Kohl's would officially open as the mall's fourth anchor store.

In March 2015, Dillard's was transformed into a clearance center and the number of floors was reduced to just one.

On August 31, 2019, it was announced that Sears would be closing this location as a part of a plan to close 85 stores nationwide. The store closed on December 15, 2019.

On July 30, 2021 it was announced that Kroger bought the former Sears location at Eastgate Mall, it's still unclear what has been decided what Kroger could do with the former Sears.

Gallery

References

External links
Official Site

Shopping malls established in 1980
Buildings and structures in Clermont County, Ohio
Shopping malls in Ohio
CBL Properties
Tourist attractions in Clermont County, Ohio
1980 establishments in Ohio